Erik Brynolf Larsson (20 June 1885 – 31 December 1973) was a Swedish long-distance runner who competed in the 1912 Summer Olympics. He finished ninth in the individual cross country competition (ca. 12 km). This was the fourth best Swedish result, so he was not awarded with a medal in the team cross country competition, where only the best three were honored. He also participated in the 10000 m event but failed to reach the final.

References

External links

1885 births
1973 deaths
Swedish male long-distance runners
Olympic athletes of Sweden
Athletes (track and field) at the 1912 Summer Olympics
Olympic cross country runners
Athletes from Stockholm